Beatrice Dawson (26 January 1908 – 16 April 1976) was a British costume designer who was nominated for an Academy Award, as well as three BAFTA nominations. She had 69 film credits from 1945 to 1976.

Dawson also worked on an episode of Walt Disney's Wonderful World of Color in 1969, which was the made-for-television film Guns in the Heather, as well as a few episodes of the television show Sir Francis Drake.

Film nominations

Oscar nomination
1956 Academy Awards for the film The Pickwick Papers, in the category of Best Costumes-Black and White. Lost to I'll Cry Tomorrow.

BAFTA nominations
18th British Academy Film Awards-Nominated in the category of Best British Costume (B/W), for the film Of Human Bondage. Lost to The Pumpkin Eater. 
18th British Academy Film Awards-nominated in the category of Best British Costume (Colour), for the film Woman of Straw. Lost to Becket.
27th British Academy Film Awards-Nominated in the category of Best Costumes, for the film A Doll's House. Lost to The Hireling.

References

External links

Film reference

1908 births
1976 deaths
English costume designers
People from Lincoln, England